The Yarrenyty Arltere Artists are a collective of Indigenous artists from Yarrenyty Arltere Town Camp in Mparntwe in the Northern Territory of Australia, best known for its soft sculptural work.

History 
Yarrenyty Arltere Artists was originally conceived in 2000 Yarrenyty Arltere Town Camp, also known as Hidden Valley Town Camp on the west side of Alice Springs. The enterprise was established in 2008.

Prominent artists includes Dulcie Sharpe, Rhonda Sharpe and Marlene Rubuntja.

Their work is represented in national art collections around Australia including the Queensland Gallery of Modern Art, National Gallery of Victoria and Museum and Art Gallery of the Northern Territory and has been featured in the Biennale of Sydney, Museum of Contemporary Art, Carriageworks, Sydney and Tarnarthi.

Accolades 

 2012 – Highly Commended, National Aboriginal and Torres Strait Islander Art Award
 2013 – Rhonda Sharpe, Winner, Wandjuk Marika 3D Memorial Award, National Aboriginal and Torres Strait Islander Art Award
 2015 – Rhonda Sharpe, Winner, 3D Award, National Aboriginal and Torres Strait Islander Art Award
 2016 – Winner, Vincent Lingiari Art Award
 2017 – Commission, NGV Triennial, National Gallery of Victoria
 2018 – In Our Hands, 2018 – 21st Sydney Biennial

References

External links 

 Official website

Australian artist groups and collectives
Australian Aboriginal artists